The Canton of Évaux-les-Bains is a canton situated in the Creuse département and in the Nouvelle-Aquitaine region of central France.

Geography 
A farming area, with the town of Évaux-les-Bains, in the arrondissement of Aubusson, at its centre. The altitude varies from 292m (Évaux-les-Bains) to 690m (Arfeuille-Châtain) with an average altitude of 488m.

Composition 
At the French canton reorganisation which came into effect in March 2015, the canton was expanded from 8 to 17 communes:
 
Arfeuille-Châtain
Auge
Budelière
Chambon-sur-Voueize
Chambonchard
Évaux-les-Bains
Fontanières
Lépaud
Lussat
Nouhant
Reterre
Saint-Julien-la-Genête
Saint-Priest
Sannat  
Tardes
Verneiges
Viersat

Population

See also 
 Arrondissements of the Creuse department
 Cantons of the Creuse department
 Communes of the Creuse department

References

Evaux-les-Bains